The following is a comprehensive discography of the Stranglers, an English rock band.

Albums

Studio albums

Live albums
The Stranglers have always toured regularly. The official albums listed below chronicle the changing face of these performances over the years.
Live (X Cert) (1979, United Artists) – UK No. 7 (BPI: Silver) (London 1977-1978) 
All Live and All of the Night (1988, Epic) – UK No. 12 (BPI: Gold) (London, Reading and Paris 1985-1987)
Live at the Hope and Anchor (1992, EMI) (London 1977)
Saturday Night, Sunday Morning (1993, Castle Communications) (London 1990)
Death and Night and Blood (1994, Receiver Records Limited) (Zurich 1985)
The Stranglers and Friends - Live in Concert (1995, Receiver Records Limited) (London 1980) 
Live in London (1997, Rialto) (London c. 1985)
Access All Areas (1997, SIS) (UK 1995)
Friday the Thirteenth (1997, Eagle) – UK #198 (London 1997)
Live at the Hammersmith Odeon '81 (1998, EMI) (London 1982; erroneously titled Live . . . '81. It was later reissued with corrected artwork)
5 Live 01 - 2CD (2001, SPV Recordings) (recorded live at ARC Music Studio, Hamburg, 2000; first release featuring Baz Warne)
Apollo Revisited (2003, Alchemy Entertainment) (Glasgow 1981)
Coast to Coast (2005, Coursegood Ltd.)  (UK 2004)
Themeninblackinbrugge (2008, Coursegood Ltd.) (Brugge 2007)
Live at the Apollo 2010 (2010, Coursegood Ltd.) (London 2010)
Feel It Live (2013, Coursegood Ltd.) (2012 Giants tour)
Black and White Live (2016, Coursegood Ltd.) (Norwich 1993, France and Belgium 2005-2014, plus 2016 studio recording of "Enough Time")
Rattus Relived - 2LP (2017, Coursegood Ltd.) (London, Bristol and Paris 2007-2016; the 2018 CD edition has slightly different content)
Themeninblackintokyo (2021, Coursegood Ltd.) (Tokyo 2019)

Compilation albums
IV (1980, US-only release on I.R.S.) (selections from The Raven plus non-album singles 1978-1980)
The Collection 1977–1982 (1982, Liberty) – UK No. 12 (BPI: Silver) ("best of" 1977–1982)
Off the Beaten Track (1986, Liberty) – UK No. 80 (non-album singles and B-sides 1977-1982)
Rarities (1988, Liberty) (rarities 1977-1981)
Singles (The UA Years) (1989, Liberty) – UK No. 57 ("best of" 1977–1982)
Greatest Hits 1977–1990 (1990, Epic) – UK No. 4 (BPI: Platinum) ("best of" 1977–1990)
 The Old Testament: The U.A. Studio Recordings (1977–1982) - 4CD box set (1992, EMI) (first 6 studio albums and non-album singles)
All Twelve Inches (1992, Epic) (12" singles 1983-1990)
The Early Years – 74-75-76 Rare Live and Unreleased (1992, Newspeak) (demos and live recordings 1974-1976)
Strangled from Birth and Beyond (1994, SIS) (rarities 1976-1992)
The Sessions (1995, Essential) (BBC Radio 1 recordings 1977-1982)
The Hit Men - 2CD (1996, EMI) UK – #113 ("best of" 1977-1991)
The Best of the Epic Years (1997, Epic) ("best of" 1982-1990)
The Collection (1997, EMI) ("best of" 1977-1982)
Collection (1998, Disky) ("best of" 1977-1982)
The Masters (1998, Eagle) ("best of" 1995-1997)
Hits and Heroes - 2CD (1999, EMI) ("best of" and rarities 1977-1982)
Hits Collection (1999, EMI) ("best of" 1977-1982)
Always the Sun (2000, Kiosk) ("best of" 1983-1990)
The UA Singles '77-79 - 10CD-single box (2001, EMI) (singles and B-sides 1977-1979)
The Very Best Stranglers Album Ever (2001, EMI) ("best of" 1977-1981)
The Stranglers (2001, Armoury) ("best of" 1995-1998)
Lies and Deception - 2CD (2002, Recall 2cd) ("best of" 1995-1998, including the entire Friday the Thirteenth)
Peaches: The Very Best of The Stranglers (2002, EMI) – UK No. 21 (BPI: Gold) ("best of" 1977-1990)
The Rarities (2002, EMI) (rarities 1976-1992)
Out of the Black (2002, Delta Music) ("best of" 1995-1998)
Sweet Smell of Success – Best of the Epic Years (2003, Epic) ("best of" 1983-1990)
Live 'n' Sleazy - 2CD (2003, Music Club) ("best of" 1995-1998, including the entire Friday the Thirteenth)
Miss You (2003, Documents) ("best of" 1995-1998)
Gold - 2CD (2003, Retro) ("best of" 1995-1998)
The Very Best of The Stranglers (2006, Sony BMG) – UK No. 28 ("best of" 1977-2004)
The Story So Far (2007, EMI) - 2CD ("best of" 1977-2006)
Decade: The Best of 1981-1990 (2009, Camden/Sony Music) ("best of" 1981-1990)
The UA Singles 1977-1982 - 3CD (2009, EMI) (complete singles and B-sides 1977-1982)
Decades Apart (2010, EMI) – UK #146 ("best of" 1977-2010)
Essential (2011, EMI) ("best of" 1977-1982)
The Weekendinblack - The Stranglers Convention 2011 - 2CD/1DVD (2012, Coursegood Ltd.) (disc 1: The Weekendinblack DVD, disc 2: Black And White live, disc 3: Giants)
Greatest Hits on CD and DVD - 1CD/1DVD (2012, EMI Gold) ("best of" 1977-2006)
All the Best - 2CD (2012, EMI) ("best of" 1977-1982)
The Old Testament: The U.A. Studio Recordings (1977-1982) - 5CD box set (2013, EMI) (first 6 studio albums and non-album singles, plus bonus disc with rarities not on original 1992 release)
Skin Deep - The Collection - 2CD (2013, Music Club Deluxe) ("best of" 1982-1990)
Here and There: The Epic B-Sides Collection 1983-1991 - 2CD (2014, Coursegood Ltd.) (B-Sides 1983-1991)

Special projects
Laid Black (2001, self-released) (acoustic re-recordings of earlier material)
Clubbed To Death (2002, The Stable) (independently produced dance-music album featuring Stranglers samples)

Singles

DVD releases
VHS and LaserDisc-only releases are not included.
 The Video Collection 1977–1982 (1982 (VHS); 2001 (DVD))
 Saturday Night, Sunday Morning (1990 (VHS); reissued in 1999 as Live at Alexandra Palace (DVD))
 Friday the Thirteenth (1997)
 Euro live (2002)
 Live '78, SF (2005)
 On Stage on Screen (2006; reissued in 2008 as Live at The Shepherds Bush Empire)
 Rattus at the Roundhouse (2007)
 Live at the Apollo (2010)
 Never To Look Back: The Video Collection 1983 - 2012  (2013) (was only available via the band’s merchandising website) Reference Guide PDF
 The Ruby Tour 2014 (2014)

Solo discographies

J.J. Burnel
Euroman Cometh (1979, United Artists)
Un Jour Parfait (1988, Epic)with Kasamatsu KoujiGankutsuou: The Count of Monte Cristo – Original Soundtrack (2005, JVC Victor)

for the numerous production and guest appearances see J.J. Burnel Discography

Dave Greenfield and J.J. Burnel
Fire & Water (Ecoutez Vos Murs) (1983, Epic)
(Greenfield is billed as "D. Greenfield" on the cover)

Hugh Cornwell

Studio albums
Wolf (1988, Virgin)
Wired (1993, Transmission) (US-title: First Bus to Babylon, 1999, Velvel)
Guilty (1997, Madfish) (US-title: Black Hair, Black Eyes, Black Suit, 1999, Velvel)
Hi Fi (2001, Koch International)
Footprints in the Desert (2002, Track)
Beyond Elysian Fields (2004, Track)
Hooverdam (2008, Invisible Hands Music)
Totem and Taboo (2012, HIS)
Monster - 2CD (2018, Sony Music/Silvertone) (includes bonus disc of acoustic versions of Stranglers songs)

Live and compilation albums
Mayday (1999, HIS; reissued in 2002 by Track) (live album)
Solo (1999, HIS) (live album) (*)
In the Dock (2003, Track) (live album) (*)
Live It and Breathe It (2005, Invisible Hands Music) (live album – selected highlights from People, Places, Pieces)
Dirty Dozen (2006, Invisible Hands Music) (live album – selected highlights from People, Places, Pieces)
People, Places, Pieces - 3CD (2006, Invisible Hands Music) (live album)
Beyond Acoustic Fields (2007, HIS) (live in-studio acoustic recording of Beyond Elysian Fields) (*)
New Songs for King Kong - 2CD (2010, Invisible Hands Music) (live album)
You're Covered (2011) (cover album – exclusive limited edition release for 2011 UK tour VIP ticket holders only)
Live at The Vera - 2CD (2014, HIS) (live album)
The Fall and Rise of Hugh Cornwell (2015, Invisible Hands Music) (compilation album)
Note: Albums marked with asterisk (*) indicate solo live performances; all others are band performances.with Robert WilliamsNosferatu (1979, United Artists)with CCW (Cornwell with Roger Cook and Andy West)CCW (1992, UFO)with Sons of Shiva (Cornwell with Sex W. Johnston)Sons of Shiva (1999, HIS; reissued in 2002 by Track) with Dr. John Cooper ClarkeThis Time It's Personal (2016, Sony Music)

The Purple Helmets(featuring J.J. Burnel, Dave Greenfield and John Ellis)'''
 Ride Again (1988, New Rose)
 Rise Again (1989, Anagram)

Paul Roberts / Faith Band / Soulsec
 Faith? (1999, not on label)
 Self Discovery (2001, not on label) (as the Faith Band)
 The First Three Singles (2001, not on label) (compilation album)
 The Pressure Sensitive (2003, not on label) (as the Faith Band)
 100 (2007, not on label) (live album)
 End Games (2007) (as Soulsec)
 States of Play'' - 2CD (2009, Lumient) (compilation album)

References

External links
 

Discography
Discographies of British artists
Stranglers, The
New wave discographies